Corless is a surname. Notable people with the surname include:

Catherine Corless (born 1954), Irish historian
Colum Corless (1922–2015), Irish hurler
Natalie Corless (born 2003), Canadian luger
Peter Corless (born 1964), American game designer
Roger Corless (1938–2007), American theologian

See also
Corliss